Vladimir Ilyich Ulyanov ( – 21 January 1924) was a Russian communist revolutionary, politician, and political theorist. He served as head of government of the Russian Soviet Federative Socialist Republic from 1917, and of the Soviet Union from 1922 until his death. Based in Marxism, his political theories are known as Leninism.

This is a Vladimir Lenin bibliography, including writings, speeches, letters and other works.

Collected Works 

His Collected Works comprise 54 volumes, each of about 650 pages, translated into English in 45 volumes by Progress Publishers, Moscow 1960–70. The following table presents the works contained.

Selected Works 
Lenin Selected Works comprise 3 volumes, translated into English by Progress Publishers, Moscow, 1970. The following table presents works included.

Other works

See also 
 List of speeches given by Vladimir Lenin
 Marxist bibliography

Notes

References

Further reading

External links 
 
 
 Lenin at the Marxists Internet Archive
 

Works by Vladimir Lenin
Lenin, Vladimir
Lenin, Vladimir